The Military Karl-Friedrich Merit Order was a military order of merit of the Grand Duchy of Baden.  Established 5 October 1805 by Charles Frederick, Elector and later Grand Duke of Baden, the order recognized outstanding military merit amongst military officers.  In 1807, medals associated with the order were added as the highest awards for bravery for non-commissioned and enlisted soldiers.

Classes 
 Grand Crosses
 Commanders
 Knights

Recipients

Grand Crosses 

 Albert of Saxony
 Prince Charles of Prussia
 Frederick Francis II, Grand Duke of Mecklenburg-Schwerin
 Frederick I, Grand Duke of Baden
 Frederick III, German Emperor
 Prince Friedrich Karl of Prussia (1828–1885)
 François Joseph Lefebvre
 Louis II, Grand Duke of Baden
 Grand Duke Michael Nikolaevich of Russia
 Helmuth von Moltke the Elder
 Nicholas I of Russia
 Albrecht von Roon
 Rupprecht, Crown Prince of Bavaria
 August von Werder
 Wilhelm II, German Emperor
 Prince William of Baden
 William I, German Emperor
 Prince William of Baden (1829–1897)
 William, Prince of Hohenzollern
 Ferdinand von Wrangel
 Friedrich Graf von Wrangel

Commanders 

 Prince Albert of Prussia (1837–1906)
 Gustav Friedrich von Beyer
 Leonhard Graf von Blumenthal
 Adolf von Glümer
 Karl von der Gröben
 Friedrich Karl von Tettenborn

Knights 

 Gustav von Alvensleben
 Georg von Bismarck
 Karl-Heinrich Brenner
 Nikolaus zu Dohna-Schlodien
 Albert Dossenbach
 Hermann Frommherz
 Hermann Göring
 Wilhelm von Hahnke
 Hermann, Prince of Hohenlohe-Langenburg
 Bruno Loerzer
 Eduard von Pestel
 Otto Wagener
 Alfred von Waldersee

Unclassified 

 Hermann Habich
 Emil Meinecke
 Karl Ritscherle

References

 
Awards established in 1805